Constantin Dumitriu (born 14 November 1953), commonly known as Dumitriu IV is a Romanian former football midfielder. He is the younger brother of Emil Dumitriu (Dumitriu II) and Dumitru Dumitriu (Dumitriu III) who were international footballers.

Honours
Steaua Bucureşti
Divizia A: 1975–76
Cupa României: 1975–76
Corvinul Hunedoara
Divizia B: 1979–80

References

External links
Constantin Dumitriu at Labtof.ro

1953 births
Living people
Romanian footballers
Association football midfielders
Liga I players
Liga II players
FC Progresul București players
FC Steaua București players
CS Corvinul Hunedoara players
Footballers from Bucharest